Football at the 1982 Asian Games was held in New Delhi, India from 20 November to 3 December 1982. In this tournament, 16 teams played in the men's competition.

Medalists

Draw
The teams were seeded based on their final ranking at the 1978 Asian Games.

Group A
 
 
 
 
 *

Group B
 
 
 
 
 *

Group C
 
 
 
 

Group D
 
 
 
 *

* Oman and North Yemen withdrew, South Yemen was moved to group D to balance the number of teams in each group.

Squads

Results

Preliminary round

Group A

Group B

Group C

Group D

Knockout round

Quarterfinals

Semifinals

Bronze medal match

 The match was scratched and Saudi Arabia were awarded the bronze medal 2–0 after the North Korean team (including officials and competitors from other sports) were handed a two-year suspension for assaulting the referee, Vijit Getkaew of Thailand, and his linesman after the final whistle of their semi-final.

Gold medal match

Final standing

References 

 The 1982 Asian Games on rsssf.com

 
1982 Asian Games events
1982
Asia
1982 Asian Games